The 2003 Asia-Pacific Rally Championship season (APRC) was an international rally championship organized by the FIA. The champion was German driver Armin Kremer.

Calendar

Points

References

External links
Official website
Results on RallyBase.nl website

Asia-Pacific Rally Championship seasons
Asia-Pacific Rally
Rally
Rally